Malcolm Silvera Gordon (born May 19, 1990) is a Canadian mixed martial artist who competes in the Flyweight division of the Ultimate Fighting Championship. He is the former TKO, WXC and HFC Flyweight Champion as well as the former PMMA Bantamweight Champion

Background

Gordon started in martial arts with Brazilian jiu-jitsu and kickboxing in Calgary, Alberta. At 19, he started spending time training in Las Vegas under the late Shawn Tompkins, a Canadian coach who had also worked with Sam Stout, Mark Hominick and Chris Horodecki.

Mixed martial arts career

Early career

After starting his professional career by winning his first four bouts, all by finish, Gordon made his Bellator debut at Bellator 119, where he defeated Chris Kelades via unanimous decision. After going 5–0 to start his career, Gordon lost his next two bouts via KO/TKO. Gordon would bounce back at the end of 2015 with a unanimous decision victory at WXC 59 over Shawn Mack . Winning his next two bouts via first round stoppages , Gordon  made his professional debut for TKO MMA against Dimitri Waardenburg in November 2016. Losing the bout in the first round, Gordon returned to WXC where he defended his flyweight title against Michael Jordan at WXC 69, winning the bout via first round knockout in only 17 seconds.

After a 21-month break, Gordon returned to challenge for the vacant TKO Flyweight title against Jordan Graham at TKO 42. Winning the bout and the title via first round kimura, Five months later Gordon returned to the cage to defend his title against James Mancini at TKO Fight Night 1. Gordon defended his crown via round two armbar and in his last bout on the regionals before signing with the UFC, Gordon faced The Ultimate Fighter: Tournament of Champions fighter Yoni Sherbatov at TKO 47, where he defeated him by the way of rear-naked choke.

Ultimate Fighting Championship

Gordon made his UFC debut on July 18th 2020 against Amir Albazi at UFC Fight Night: Figueiredo vs. Benavidez 2. Amir and Gordon both had only two weeks' notice as they replaced Tagir Ulanbekov and Aleksander Doskalchuk, who pulled out of the event following the death of Abdulmanap Nurmagomedov. Amir defeated Gordon by submission inside 4 minutes and 42 seconds of the first round.

Gordon faced Su Mudaerji on November 28, 2020 at UFC on ESPN: Smith vs. Clark. He lost the fight via knockout less than a minute into round one.

Gordon faced Francisco Figueiredo on July 17, 2021 at UFC on ESPN 26. He won the fight via unanimous decision.

Gordon was scheduled to face Denys Bondar on November 20, 2021 at UFC Fight Night 198. However, Gordon withdrew from the event for undisclosed reasons. The bout was rescheduled and eventually took place at UFC Fight Night 200 on February 5, 2022. Gordon won the fight via technical knockout in round one after Bondar broke his arm trying to get up.

Gordon was scheduled to face Allan Nascimento on August 13, 2022 at UFC on ESPN 41. > However, Gordon pulled out in late July due to an undisclosed injury.

Gordon faced Muhammad Mokaev on October 22, 2022 at UFC 280. He lost the bout via armbar at the end of the third round.

Gordon faced Jake Hadley on March 18, 2023, at UFC 286. At the weigh-ins, Gordon weighed in at 129.5 pounds, three and a half pounds over the flyweight non-title fight limit. The bout is expected to proceed at catchweight and he will be fined 30% of his purse which will go to his opponent Hadley. He lost the bout in the first round, being dropped with a body punch and finished on the ground.

Championships and accomplishments

Mixed martial arts
TKO Major League MMA
TKO Flyweight Championship (One time)
Two Successful Defenses
Warrior Xtreme Cagefighting
WXC Flyweight Championship (One time)
One Successful Defense
Prodigy MMA
PMMA Bantamweight Championship (One time)
Havoc Fighting Championship
HFC Flyweight Championship (One time)

Mixed martial arts record

|-
|Loss
|align=center|14–7
|Jake Hadley
|TKO (punches)
|UFC 286
|
|align=center|1
|align=center|1:01
|London, England
|
|-
|Loss
|align=center|14–6
|Muhammad Mokaev
|Submission (armbar)
|UFC 280
|
|align=center|3
|align=center|4:26
|Abu Dhabi, United Arab Emirates
|
|-
|Win
| align=center|14–5
|Denys Bondar
|TKO (arm injury)
|UFC Fight Night: Hermansson vs. Strickland
| 
|align=center|1
|align=center|1:22
|Las Vegas, Nevada, United States
|
|-
|Win
|align=center| 13–5
|Francisco Figueiredo
|Decision (unanimous)
|UFC on ESPN: Makhachev vs. Moisés
|
|align=center|3
|align=center|5:00
|Las Vegas, Nevada, United States
|
|-
| Loss
| align=center| 12–5
| Su Mudaerji
| KO (punches)
| UFC on ESPN: Smith vs. Clark
| 
| align=center|1
| align=center|0:44
| Las Vegas, Nevada, United States
| 
|-
| Loss
| align=center| 12–4
|Amir Albazi
| Submission (triangle choke)
|UFC Fight Night: Figueiredo vs. Benavidez 2 
|
|align=center|1
|align=center|4:42
|Abu Dhabi, United Arab Emirates
|
|-
| Win
| align=center| 12–3
| Yoni Sherbatov
| Submission (rear-naked choke)
|TKO 47
|
|align=center|1
|align=center|1:32
|Montreal, Ontario, Canada
| 
|-
| Win
| align=center| 11–3
| James Mancini
| Submission (armbar)
|TKO Fight Night 1
|
|align=center|2
|align=center|2:02
|Montreal, Ontario, Canada
|
|-
| Win
| align=center| 10–3
|Jordan Graham
|Submission (kimura)
|TKO 42
|
|align=center|1
|align=center|3:26
|Laval, Quebec, Canada
|
|-
| Win
| align=center| 9–3
| Michael Jordan
| KO (punches)
| WXC 69 
| 
| align=center| 1
| align=center| 0:17
| Southgate, Michigan, United States
|
|-
| Loss
| align=center|8–3
| Dimitri Waardenburg
| TKO (punches)
| TKO 36
| 
| align=center|1
| align=center|4:09
| Montreal, Ontario, Canada
|
|-
| Win
| align=center|8–2
| Jesse Bazzi
|Submission (kimura)
|WXC 64
|
|align=center|1
|align=center|3:31
|Taylor, Michigan, United States
|
|-
| Win
| align=center|7–2
|Andrew Cseh
| KO (punches)
|Prodigy MMA
| 
| align=center|1
| align=center|4:04
| Erie, Pennsylvania, United States
|
|-
| Win
| align=center|6–2
| Tashawn Mack
|Decision (unanimous)
| WXC 59
| 
| align=center|3
| align=center|5:00
| Taylor, Michigan, United States
|
|-
| Loss
| align=center| 5–2
| Austin Ryan
| TKO (punches)
| Havoc FC 8
| 
| align=center| 2
| align=center| 3:20
| Red Deer, Alberta, Canada
| 
|-
| Loss
| align=center| 5–1
|Randy Turner
| TKO (punches)
| PFC 3
|
|align=Center|2
|align=center|3:17
|London, Ontario, Canada
| 
|-
| Win
| align=center| 5–0
| Chris Kelades
|Decision (unanimous)
|Bellator 119
|
|align=center|3
|align=center|5:00
|Rama, Ontario, Canada
|
|-
| Win
| align=center| 4–0
| Michael Davis
| Submission (kimura)
|Havoc FC 4
|
|align=center|2
|align=center|2:16
|Red Deer, Alberta, Canada
|
|-
| Win
| align=center| 3–0
| Lloyd Reyes
| TKO (punches)
| Provincial FC 1
| 
| align=center| 1
| align=center| 3:38
| London, Ontario, Canada
| 
|-
| Win
| align=center| 2–0
| Ahmad Kakar
| TKO (punches)
| Substance Cage Combat 1
| 
| align=center| 2
| align=center| 2:36
| Toronto, Ontario, Canada
|
|-
| Win
| align=center| 1–0
| Tyler Kirk
| Submission (armbar)
| Score Fighting Series 6
| 
| align=center| 1
| align=center| 2:16
| Sarnia, Ontario, Canada
|

See also 
 List of current UFC fighters
 List of male mixed martial artists
 List of Canadian UFC fighters

References

External links 
  
  

1990 births
Living people
Canadian male mixed martial artists
Flyweight mixed martial artists
Mixed martial artists utilizing kickboxing
Mixed martial artists utilizing Brazilian jiu-jitsu
Ultimate Fighting Championship male fighters
Canadian practitioners of Brazilian jiu-jitsu
People awarded a black belt in Brazilian jiu-jitsu
Sportspeople from Calgary